Aïssa Mandi (born 22 October 1991) is a professional footballer who plays for La Liga club Villarreal and the Algeria national team. Mainly a central defender, he can also play as a right-back.

Born in France, Mandi made his international debut for Algeria in March 2014. He was a member of the Algerian team for the 2014 FIFA World Cup in Brazil as well as the 2015, 2017, 2019 and 2021 Africa Cup of Nations, winning the 2019 tournament.

Club career

Reims
Mandi started to play football at the age of 8 at Reims. On 20 August 2010, he made his professional debut as a starter for the club in a Ligue 2 match against Le Havre.

On 5 April 2014, Mandi scored two own goals in a match against Paris Saint-Germain.

Betis
On 30 June 2016, Mandi signed a five-year deal with La Liga side Real Betis.

Villarreal
On 16 June 2021, Mandi signed a four-year contract with fellow La Liga side Villarreal, as his contract with Betis expired.

On 11 August 2021, he got his professional Villarreal debut against Chelsea in the 2021 UEFA Super Cup where he went on to miss a penalty in the penalty shoot-out.

International career
While he was also eligible to play for France, Mandi decided to play for Algeria and made his debut for them on 5 March 2014 in a 2–0 victory over Slovenia.
He was one of the revelations of the Algerian national team during the 2014 World Cup in Brazil.

Mandi scored his first goal for Algeria in a 3–3 away draw to Ethiopia during the qualifiers for the 2017 Africa Cup of Nations in Gabon.

Personal life
Mandi was born in the town of Châlons-en-Champagne in Northern France to Algerian parents from Chlef.

Career statistics

Club

International

 
Scores and results list Algeria's goal tally first, score column indicates score after each Mandi goal.

Honours
Algeria
 Africa Cup of Nations: 2019

References

External links

Profile at the Villarreal CF website
 
 
 

1991 births
Living people
People from Châlons-en-Champagne
French sportspeople of Algerian descent
Sportspeople from Marne (department)
French footballers
Algerian footballers
Association football defenders
Algeria international footballers
2014 FIFA World Cup players
2015 Africa Cup of Nations players
2017 Africa Cup of Nations players
2019 Africa Cup of Nations players
2021 Africa Cup of Nations players
Ligue 1 players
Ligue 2 players
Championnat National players
Stade de Reims players
La Liga players
Real Betis players
Villarreal CF players
French expatriate footballers
Algerian expatriate footballers
French expatriate sportspeople in Spain
Algerian expatriate sportspeople in Spain
Expatriate footballers in Spain
Footballers from Grand Est